George Roger Edwards (October 11, 1914 – June 9, 2009) was an American archaeologist and curator for the University of Pennsylvania Museum of Archaeology and Anthropology.

Biography
He was born in Southington, Connecticut on October 11, 1914 to George Edwards and Alice Heathcote. He attended Lewis High School in Southington, Connecticut then earned an undergraduate degree from Bowdoin College in 1933 and a M.S. from Johns Hopkins University in 1937. He earned a Ph.D. in archaeology from the University of Pennsylvania in 1939.

Edwards became the assistant curator for the Bowdoin College Museum of Art. He moved to Philadelphia in 1950 as assistant professor of classical archaeology and an assistant curator for the University of Pennsylvania Museum of Archaeology and Anthropology. Edwards excavated at several sites including Gordium in Turkey in 1951 and Kourion in Cyprus in 1954. He rose to the position of full professor and retired in 1980 with the title curator emeritus.

He died on June 9, 2009 in Haverford, Pennsylvania.

Publications
An Ivory (1961)
Corinth: results of excavations conducted by the American school
The Gordion Campaign of 1958: Preliminary Report (1959)
The Potters' Quarter: The Pottery (1984)

References

1914 births
2009 deaths
University of Pennsylvania
University of Pennsylvania Museum of Archaeology and Anthropology
People from Southington, Connecticut
20th-century American archaeologists
Historians from Connecticut